The 11th Mieczysław Połukard Criterium of Polish Speedway League Aces was the 1992 version of the Mieczysław Połukard Criterium of Polish Speedway Leagues Aces. It took place on March 22 in the Polonia Stadium in Bydgoszcz, Poland.

Final standings

Sources 
 Roman Lach - Polish Speedway Almanac

See also 

Criterium of Aces
Mieczysław Połukard Criterium of Polish Speedway Leagues Aces
Mieczyslaw Polukard